The Six Schools League (SSL) is an athletic league composed of six New England prep schools. It was founded in 2015 as the Five Schools League by Phillips Exeter Academy, Phillips Academy Andover, Choate Rosemary Hall, Deerfield Academy, and Northfield Mount Hermon School. The league aims to quell aggressive athletic recruiting among member schools, as well as support friendly competition. 

Starting with the 2017–2018 school year, St. Paul's School joined the Six Schools League.

See also
 Independent School League (New England)
 Eight Schools Association

References 

 
High school sports conferences and leagues in the United States
Preparatory schools in the United States
Youth organizations based in Massachusetts
Youth organizations based in New Hampshire
Youth organizations based in Connecticut